The khopesh (also vocalized khepesh) is an Egyptian sickle-shaped sword that evolved from battle axes.

Description
A typical khopesh is 50–60 cm (20–24 inches) in length, though smaller examples also exist. The inside curve of the weapon could be used to trap an opponent's arm, or to pull an opponent's shield out of the way. These weapons changed from bronze to iron in the New Kingdom period. The earliest known depiction of a khopesh is from the Stele of the Vultures, depicting King Eannatum of Lagash wielding the weapon; this would date the khopesh to at least 2500 BC.

The blade is only sharpened on the outside portion of the curved end. The khopesh evolved from the epsilon or similar crescent-shaped axes that were used in warfare.

History
The khopesh fell out of use around 1300 BC. However, on the 196 BC Rosetta Stone, it is referenced as the "sword" determinative in a hieroglyph block, with the spelled letters of kh, p, and sh to say:

Shall be set up a statue ..., the Avenger of Baq-t-(Egypt), the interpretation whereof is 'Ptolemy, the strong one of Kam-t'-(Egypt), and a statue of the god of the city, giving to him a sword royal of victory, ... 

Various pharaohs are depicted with a khopesh, and some have been found in royal graves, such as the two examples found with Tutankhamun.

Although some examples have clearly sharpened edges, many examples have dull edges that apparently were never intended to be sharp. It may therefore be possible that some khopeshes found in high-status graves were ceremonial variants.

Etymology
The word khopesh may have been derived from "leg", as in "leg of beef", because of their similarity in shape. The hieroglyph for ḫpš ('leg') is found as early as during the time of the Coffin Texts (the First Intermediate Period).

In media
 Khopeshes were used by Egyptians in many films of the Book of Exodus including the 1923, 1956, 1974, 1995, 1998 and its prequel, 2006, 2007, 2014, and 2016 films, as well as the Moses episode of Testament.
 A khopesh was a weapon wielded by Goliath, the Phillistine giant and old enemy of David on The Bible
 Khopeshes were among many weapons used by Minotaurs on The Chronicles of Narnia films such as the 2005 version of The Lion, the Witch and the Wardrobe, the 2008 version of Prince Caspian, and the 2010 version of The Voyage of the Dawn Treader.
 An ornately-decorated black-bladed khopesh was the weapon of choice for the fictional Egyptian Pharaoh Kahmunrah in Night at the Museum: Battle of the Smithsonian.

See also

References

Bibliography

External links

Ancient Near East weapons
African swords
Bronze Age
Middle Eastern swords
Military history of ancient Egypt
Sumer
Weapons of Egypt